Robert Nagy (born 27 March 1963) is a French windsurfer. He competed in the Division II event at the 1988 Summer Olympics.

References

1963 births
Living people
Sportspeople from Saône-et-Loire
French windsurfers
Olympic sailors of France
Sailors at the 1988 Summer Olympics – Division II
French male sailors (sport)